My Mother Gets Married is a 1936 novel by Swedish writer Moa Martinson. It was translated into English by Margaret S Lacy, published in 1973.

References 

1936 Swedish novels
Swedish-language novels